= NetWAR =

1997 video game

- Developer(s): Semi Logic
- Publisher(s): Headland Digital Media
- Platform(s): Windows
- Release: October 1997
- Genre(s): Shooter video game
- Mode(s): Single-player, multiplayer

NetWAR is a video game developed by American studio Semi Logic and published by Headland Digital Media.

== Gameplay ==
NetWAR was a multiplayer internet action game involving numerous players, with each player represented as an individual warrior on a huge battlefield.

== Reception ==
Next Generation reviewed the game, rating it three stars out of five, and stated that "NetWAR has most of the right parts in place to be a fun, multiplayer-only, online game, and it's priced to sell."

== Reviews ==
- Computer Gaming World #164 (Mar 1998)
- The Adrenaline Vault
